CAS Space (Guangzhou Zhongke Aerospace Exploration Technology Co., Ltd.) is a Chinese commercial space launch enterprise founded in 2018 of mixed ownership, partially owned by the Chinese Academy of Sciences.  Originally started in Beijing, the enterprise is now headquarterd in Guangzhou, China, while its Beijing location continues to be its primary R&D center. The enterprise has constructed its dedicated launch pad and facilities at JSLC. The launch pad is considered the first launch pad in China built for commercial use. The enterprise has multiple subsidiaries including a Guangzhou-based company responsible for the operation of its aerospace technology & industry base and a Xi'an-based propulsion system company. The enterprise is purposed to materialize research projects from Chinese Academy of Sciences and is dedicated to space exploration, research and to be a launch service provider. The enterprise is currently developing the Kinetica (Lijian) rocket family.

The enterprise has a motto of "Go above and beyond", or "无畏向上 无限可能" as it is publicized in Chinese.

Rockets

Kinetica 1

It consists of four all solid fuel stages. The Kinetica 1 is capable of lifting 1.5 t (1.65 tons) to SSO at an altitude of 500 km or 2 t (2.20 tons) to LEO.

CAS Space conducted ground tests for the four-stage Kinetica 1 in November 2021. Its maiden flight was conducted on 27 July 2022, sending 6 satellites into SSO. It is currently the largest solid-fueled rocket in China.

Kinetica 1A, 2, 3, 3H

The enterprise has presented a roadmap including a medium-lift launch vehicle Kinetica 1A (scheduled to enter service in 2022), a small-lift liquid-fueled reusable vehicle Kinetica 2, a medium-lift reusable vehicle Kinetica 3 with its heavier variant Kinetica 3H (2 boosters added), and a sub-orbital experimental vehicle Near-space Experimental Reusable Platform (NEXT-REP).

Space Tourism Vehicle

In August 2021, it was announced that CAS Space was developing a single stage sub-orbital space tourism vehicle which is very similar to Blue Origin's New Shepard rocket. The vehicle, composed of a booster and capsule, would be powered by five Xuanyuan engines. An uncrewed demonstration flight is expected to occur in 2022, then a full-fledged unmanned suborbital flight in 2023, with tourism service to start in 2024. The vehicle under development is designated ZK-6.

References 

Aerospace companies of China
Space launch vehicles of China
Private spaceflight companies
Commercial spaceflight
Commercial launch service providers
Chinese companies established in 2018